Triteleia is a genus of monocotyledon flowering plants also known as triplet lilies. The 16 species are native to western North America, from British Columbia south to California and east to Wyoming and Arizona, with one species in northwestern Mexico. However they are most common in California. They are perennial plants growing from a fibrous corm, roughly spherical in shape. They get their name from the fact that all parts of their flowers come in threes.

Taxonomy and systematics
The Angiosperm Phylogeny Group's 2009 revision placed the genus in family Asparagaceae, subfamily Brodiaeoideae (having previously placed treated Brodiaeoideae as a separate family Themidaceae). Other modern authors place it in the family Alliaceae. Both these families are in the order Asparagales.

There are currently 16 recognized species in Triteleia. One species, Triteleia ixioides, has five well-defined subspecies. Varieties and subspecies have been proposed within several other Triteleia species, but these are no longer widely accepted. Some common species that are now placed in genus Triteleia were formerly placed in genus Brodiaea, and as a consequence the word "brodiaea" has been incorporated into some of their common names.

Triteleia × versicolor – Pinto triplet lily – a sterile hybrid believed to be T. hyacinthina × T. ixioides, recorded only from the type specimen collected in 1935 at Whaler's Knoll in Point Lobos State Park, Monterey County

A 2002 phylogenetic review of related genera found four clades within Triteleia that were all supported with 100 percent jackknife resampling
values:
 Triteleia montana and Triteleia lemmoniae
 Triteleia peduncularis, Triteleia laxa, and Triteleia bridgesii
 Triteleia hyacinthina and Triteleia ixioides
 Triteleia grandiflora, Triteleia crocea, and Triteleia hendersonii

References

Jepson treatment

Sources
 

 
Asparagaceae genera